Golomt Bank is one of the largest privately owned banks in Mongolia. Founded on March 6 of 1995, Golomt Bank grew into the leading commercial bank of Mongolia, producing ¼ of the Mongolian national GDP and constituting 20% of Mongolian banking system as of end of 2015. The bank has well-established domestic and international client bases in both corporate and retail market. Worldwide financial magazines such as Global Finance, Euromoney and the Banker named Golomt Bank as the best bank of Mongolia.

As of 31 December 2015 the Bank had 71 branches within Mongolia. Also, 26 sub-branches along with digital channels including ATMs, Internet and Mobile banking.

Employees
As of 2011, Golomt has over 1,000 employees, with 30% male and 70% female.

See also
 Bank of Mongolia

References

External links
 Official website

Banks of Mongolia
Organizations based in Ulaanbaatar